Warut Wongdee (born March 29, 1986) is a Thai professional footballer who plays as a midfielder for Thai League 3 club Lamphun Warrior.

References

External links

https://www.siamsporttalk.com/th/component/joomsport/player/973.html?Itemid=182

1991 births
Living people
Warut Wongdee
Association football midfielders
Warut Wongdee
Warut Wongdee
Warut Wongdee
Warut Wongdee